Endra Nicette Ha-Tiff (born 28 July 1976) is a Seychellois former windsurfer. Endra competed in the women's mistral at the 2000 Summer Olympics. The event consisted of eleven races and she finished overall in last position

References

External links
 
 
 

1976 births
Living people
Seychellois windsurfers
Female windsurfers
Seychellois female sailors (sport)
Olympic sailors of Seychelles
Sailors at the 2000 Summer Olympics – Mistral One Design